Late Quaternary prehistoric birds are avian taxa that became extinct during the Late Quaternary – the Late Pleistocene or Early Holocene – and before recorded history, specifically before they could be studied alive by ornithological science. They had died out before the period of global scientific exploration that started in the late 15th century. In other words, this list deals with avian extinctions between 40,000 BC and AD 1500. For the purposes of this article, a "bird" is any member of the clade Neornithes, that is, any descendant of the most recent common ancestor of all currently living birds.

The birds are known from their remains, which are subfossil; as the remains are not completely fossilized, they may yield organic material for molecular analyses to provide additional clues for resolving their taxonomic affiliations. Some birds are also known from folk memory, as in the case of Haast's eagle in New Zealand.

The extinction of the taxa in this list was coincident with the expansion of Homo sapiens beyond Africa and Eurasia, and in most cases, anthropogenic factors played a crucial part in their extinction, be it through hunting, introduced predators or habitat alteration. It is notable that a large proportion of the species are from oceanic islands, especially in Polynesia. Bird taxa that evolved on oceanic islands are usually very vulnerable to hunting or predation by rats, dogs, cats or pigs (animals commonly introduced by humans) as they evolved in the absence of mammalian predators, and therefore have only rudimentary predator avoidance behavior. Many, especially rails, have additionally become flightless for the same reason and thus present even easier prey.

Taxon extinctions taking place before the Late Quaternary happened in the absence of significant human interference. Rather, reasons for extinction are random abiotic events such as bolide impacts, climate changes, mass volcanic eruptions, etc. Alternatively, species may have become extinct due to evolutionary displacement by successor or competitor taxa – it is notable for example that in the early Neogene, seabird biodiversity was much higher than today; this is probably due to competition by the radiation of marine mammals after that time. The relationships of these ancient birds are often hard to determine, as many are known only from very fragmentary remains and complete fossilization precludes analysis of information from DNA, RNA or protein sequencing.

Extinct bird species differed from extant birds by being larger, mostly restricted to islands, and often flightless. These factors made them especially vulnerable to human prosecution and to other anthropogenically related declines.

Taxonomic list of Late Quaternary prehistoric birds
All of these birds are in Neornithes.

Struthioniformes
The ostriches and related ratites.
 †Aepyornithidae Bonaparte 1853 – elephant birds
 †Mullerornis Milne-Edwards & Grandidier 1894
 Robust elephant bird, Mullerornis modestus (Milne-Edwards & Grandidier, 1869) Hansford & Turvey 2018
 †Aepyornis St. Hilaire 1850
 Giant elephant bird, Aepyornis maximus St. Hilaire 1851 [Aepyornis modestus Milne-Edwards & Grandidier 1869; Aepyornis ingens Milne-Edwards & Grandidier 1894; Aepyornis titan Andrews 1894; Mullerornis titan (Andrews 1894); Diornis maximus (St. Hilaire 1851)] 
 Hildebrandt's elephant bird, Aepyornis hildebrandti Burckhardt 1893 [Aepyornis mulleri Milne-Edwards & Grandidier 1894; Mullerornis hildebrandti (Burckhardt 1893); Aepyornis minimus] 
 †Vorombe Hansford & Turvey 2018
 Vorombe titan Andrews 1894 [Aepyornis titan Andrews 1894; Aepyornis ingens Milne-Edwards and Grandidier 1894]
 
 †Emeidae – moa
 †Anomalopteryx
 Bush moa, Anomalopteryx didiformis (North and South Islands, New Zealand)
 †Euryapteryx
 Broad-billed moa, Euryapteryx curtus (North Island, New Zealand)
 †Pachyornis
 Crested moa, Pachyornis australis (western South Island, New Zealand)
 Heavy-footed moa, Pachyornis elephantopus (eastern South Island, New Zealand)
 Mantell's moa, Pachyornis geranoides (North Island, New Zealand) 
 †Emeus
 Eastern moa, Emeus crassus (South Island, New Zealand)
 †Dinornithidae – moa
 †Dinornis
 North Island giant moa, Dinornis novaezealandiae (North Island, New Zealand)
 South Island giant moa, Dinornis robustus (South Island, New Zealand)
 †Megalapterygidae – moa
 †Megalapteryx
 Upland moa, Megalapteryx didinus (South Island, New Zealand) – may have survived into historic times (syn. Megalapteryx benhami)
 Struthionidae – ostriches
 Extinct species of extant genera
 Asian ostrich, Struthio asiaticus (Central Asia to China)
 Apterygidae – kiwi
 Extinct species of extant genera
 Eastern tokoeka, Apteryx sp. (South Island, New Zealand) – possibly synomynous with either the Okarito (A. rowi), great spotted (A. haastii) or southern brown kiwi (A. australis)

Dromornithidae
An extinct clade of massive galloansere birds.
 †Dromornithidae – Australian mihirungs or "demon ducks of doom"
 †Genyornis
 Genyornis newtoni (Australia)

Anseriformes
The group that includes modern ducks and geese.
 Anatidae – ducks, geese and swans
 †Cnemiornis
 South Island goose, Cnemiornis calcitrans (South Island, New Zealand)
 North Island goose, Cnemiornis gracilis (North Island, New Zealand)
 †Centrornis
 Malagasy sheldgoose, Centrornis majori (Madagascar) (syn. Alopochen)
 †Chelychelynechen
 Turtle-jawed moa-nalo, Chelychelynechen quassus  (Kauai, Hawaiian Islands)
 †Ptaiochen
 Small-billed moa-nalo, Ptaiochen pau (Maui, Hawaiian Islands)
 †Thambetochen
 Maui Nui large-billed moa-nalo, Thambetochen chauliodous  (Maui and Molokai, Hawaiian Islands)
 Oahu moa-nalo, Thambetochen xanion  (Oahu, Hawaiian Islands)
 †Chendytes
 Chendytes lawi (California and southern Oregon coasts and Channel Islands, East Pacific)
 †Talpanas
 Kauai mole duck, Talpanas lippa (Kauai, Hawaiian Islands) 
 Extinct species of extant genera
 Aitutaki whistling-duck, Dendrocygna sp. (Aitutaki, Cook Islands)
 Nēnē-nui, Branta hylobadistes (Maui, possibly Kauai and Oahu, Hawaiian Islands)
 Giant Hawaii goose, Branta rhuax (Big Island, Hawaiian Islands) – formerly in the monotypic genus Geochen
 Chatham Islands shelduck, Tadorna cf. variegata (Chatham Islands, Southwest Pacific)
 Malagasy shelduck, Alopochen sirabensis (Madagascar)
 Scarlett's duck, Malacorhynchus scarletti (New Zealand)
 Finsch's duck, Chenonetta finschi (New Zealand) – possibly survived to 1870
 Bermuda flightless duck, Anas pachyscelus (Bermuda, West Atlantic)
 Macquarie Islands teal, Anas cf. chlorotis (Macquarie Islands, Southwest Pacific)
 Chatham duck, Anas chathamica (Chatham Islands, Southwest Pacific)
 Dyuktai goose, Anser djuktaiensis (Yakutia, Russia)
 Chatham Island merganser, Mergus milleneri (Chatham Islands, Southwest Pacific)
 New Zealand stiff-tailed duck, Oxyura vantetsi (North Island, New Zealand)
 New Zealand musk duck, Biziura delautouri (New Zealand)
 Giant swan, Cygnus falconeri (Malta, Sicily)
 Dwarf sawn, Cygnus equitum (Malta, Sicily) – occasionally placed in the genus Anser 
 New Zealand swan, Cygnus sumnerensis (New Zealand and the Chatham Islands)
 New Zealand swan, Cygnus sumnerensis sumnerensis (New Zealand)
 Chatham Islands swan, Cygnus sumnerensis chathamicus (Chatham Islands, Southwest Pacific)
 Anser aff. erythropus (Ibiza)
 Neochen barbadiana (Barbados)
 Neochen debilis (Argentina)
 Neochen pugil (Brazil)
Extinct subspecies of extant species
 Chatham Islands teal, Anas chlorotis ssp. nov. (Chatham Islands, Southwest Pacific)
 Placement unresolved
 Giant O'ahu goose, Anatidae sp. et gen. indet.  (Oahu, Hawaiian Islands)
 Long-legged shelduck, Anatidae sp. et gen. indet. (Kauai, Hawaiian Islands)
 Rota flightless duck, Anatidae sp. et gen. indet. (Rota, Marianas)

Pangalliformes
The group that includes modern chickens and quails.
 †Sylviornithidae – sylviornises or New Caledonian giant megapodes
 †Megavitiornis
 Noble megapode or deep-billed megapode, Megavitiornis altirostris (Viti Levu, Fiji)
 †Sylviornis
 Sylviornis neocaledoniae (New Caledonia, Melanesia)

True Galliformes
 Megapodidae – megapodes
 †Mwalau
 Mwalau walterlinii (Efate, Vanuatu) 
 Extinct species of extant genera
 Consumed scrubfowl, Megapodius alimentum (Tonga and Fiji)
 Viti Levu scrubfowl, Megapodius amissus (Viti Levu and possibly Kadavu and Aiwa, Fiji) – may have survived to the early 19th or the 20th century
 Pile-builder megapode, Megapodius molistructor (New Caledonia, Tonga and possibly Aiwa, Fiji)
 Eua scrubfowl or small-footed megapode, Megapodius sp. (Eua, Tonga)
 Lifuka scrubfowl, Megapodius sp. (Lifuka, Tonga)
 Stout Tongan megapode Megapodius sp. (Tongatapu, Tonga)
 Megapodius sp. (Ofu, Samoa)
 Large Solomon Islands megapode Megapodius sp. (Buka Island, Solomon Islands)
 New Caledonia megapode Megapodius sp. (Grande Tierre, New Caledonia)
 Loyalty megapode Megapodius sp. (Lifou and Maré, Loyalty Islands)
 New Ireland scrubfowl or large Bismarck's megapode, Megapodius sp. (New Ireland, Melanesia)
 Giant malleefowl, Leipoa gallinacea (Australia) – Progura gallinacea and Progura naracoortensis are synonyms
 Phasianidae – pheasants and allies
 Extinct species of extant genera
 Canary Islands quail, Coturnix gomerae (Canary Islands, East Atlantic)
 Porto Santo quail, Coturnix alabrevis (Madeira, East Atlantic)
 Cape Verde quail, Coturnix centensis (Cape Verde, East Atlantic)
 Madeiran quail, Coturnix lignorum (Madeira, East Atlantic)
 Californian turkey, Meleagris californica (California, North America)

Charadriiformes
Gulls, auks and shorebirds
 Laridae – gulls
 Extinct species of extant genera
 Huahine gull or Society Islands gull, Chroicocephalus utunui (Huahine, Society Islands)
 Kauai gull, Larus sp. (Kauai, Hawaiian Islands)
 Larus sp. (Saint Helena, Atlantic) – may be an extant form
 Charadriidae – lapwings and plovers
 Extinct species of extant genera
 Malagasy lapwing, Vanellus madagascariensis (Madagascar)
 Alcidae – auks
 Extinct species of extant genera
 Dow's puffin, Fratercula dowi (Channel Islands, East Pacific)
 Scolopacidae – waders and snipes
Extinct species of extant genera
Henderson Island sandpiper, Prosobonia sp. (Henderson Island, South Pacific)
 Mangaian sandpiper, Prosobonia sp. (Mangaia, Cook Islands)
 Ua Huka sandpiper, Prosobonia sp. (Ua Huka, Marquesas Islands)
 Forbes's snipe, Coenocorypha chathamensis (Chatham Islands, Southwest Pacific)
 Viti Levu snipe, Coenocorypha miratropica (Viti Levu, Fiji)
 New Caledonian snipe, Coenocorypha neocaledonica (New Caledonia, Melanesia)
 Norfolk Island snipe, Coenocorypha sp. (Norfolk Island, Southwest Pacific)
 Gallinago kakuki (Cuba, Cayman Brac, Cayman Islands, Bahamas, West Indies)
 Scolopax anthonyi (Puerto Rico, West Indies)
 Scolopax brachycarpa (Hispaniola, West Indies) – may have survived into historic times

Gruiformes
The group that includes modern rails and cranes.
 Rallidae – rails
 †Capellirallus (syn. Gallirallus)
 Snipe-rail, Capellirallus karamu (North Island, New Zealand)
 †Vitirallus (syn. Gallirallus)
 Viti Levu rail, Vitirallus watlingi (Viti Levu, Fiji)
 †Hovacrex (syn. Gallinula)
 Hova gallinule, Hovacrex roberti (Madagascar)
 †Nesotrochis
 Antillean cave rail, Nesotrochis debooyi (Puerto Rico and Virgin Islands, West Indies) – may have survived into historic times
 Haitian cave rail, Nesotrochis steganinos (Haiti, West Indies)
 Cuban cave rail, Nesotrochis picapicensis (Cuba, West Indies)
 Extinct species of extant genera
 New Caledonian gallinule, Porphyrio kukwiedei (New Caledonia, Melanesia) – may have survived into historic times
 North Island takahē, Porphyrio mantelli (North Island, New Zealand)
 Huahine swamphen, Porphyrio mcnabi (Huahine, Society Islands)
 Marquesas swamphen, Porphyrio paepae (Hiva Oa and Tahuata, Marquesas) – may have survived to the late 19th century
 Buka swamphen, Porphyrio sp. (Buka, Solomon Islands)
 Giant swamphen, Porphyrio sp. (New Ireland, Melanesia)
 Mangaia swamphen, Porphyrio sp. (Mangaia, Cook Islands) (not to genus Pareudiastes)
 New Ireland swamphen, Porphyrio sp. (New Ireland, Melanesia)
 Norfolk Island swamphen, Porphyrio sp. (Norfolk Island, Southwest Pacific)
 Rota swamphen, Porphyrio sp. (Rota, Marianas)
 Ibiza rail, Rallus eivissensis (Ibiza, Mediterranean)
 Madeira rail, Rallus lowei (Madeira, Macaronesia)
 Porto Santo rail, Rallus adolfocaesaris (Porto Santo Island, Macaronesia)
 Rallus sp. (known from subfossil remains found on Madeira and Porto Santo Island)
 São Miguel rail,  Rallus carvaoensis (São Miguel Island, Azores)
 Pico rail, Rallus montivagorum (Pico Island, Azores)
 São Jorge rail, Rallus nanus  (São Jorge Island, Azores) (erroneously previously described as Rallus minutus, which is a junior homonym)
 Graciosa rail, Rallus sp. (Graciosa, Azores)
 Terceira rail, Rallus sp. (Terceira, Azores)
 Santa Maria rail, Rallus sp. (Santa Maria Island, Azores)
 Lifuka rail, Gallirallus sp. (Lifuka, Tonga)
 Nuku Hiva rail, Gallirallus epulare (Nuku Hiva, Marquesas)
 Ua Huka rail, Gallirallus gracilitibia (Ua Huka, Marquesas)
 Niue rail, Gallirallus huiatua (Niue, Cook Islands)
 Mangaia rail, Gallirallus ripleyi (Mangaia, Cook Islands)
 Tahuata rail, Gallirallus roletti (Tahuata, Marquesas)
 Huahine rail, Gallirallus storrsolsoni (Huahine, Society Islands)
 Hiva Oa rail, Gallirallus sp. (Marquesas, Pacific)
 Eua rail, Gallirallus vekamatolu (Eua, Tonga)
 Rota rail, Gallirallus temptatus (Rota, Marianas, West Pacific)
 Aguiguan rail, Gallirallus pisonii (Aguiguan, Marianas, West Pacific)
 Tinian rail, Gallirallus pendiculentus (Tinian, Marianas, West Pacific)
 Saipan rail, Gallirallus sp. (Saipan, Marianas, West Pacific)
 New Ireland rail, Gallirallus ernstmayri (New Ireland, Melanesia)
 Norfolk Island rail, Gallirallus sp. (Norfolk Island, Southwest Pacific) – may have survived to the 19th century
 Great Oahu crake, Porzana ralphorum (Oahu, Hawaiian Islands)
 Great Maui crake, Porzana severnsi (Maui, Hawaiian Islands)
 Mangaia crake, Porzana rua (Mangaia, Cook Islands)
 Liliput crake, Porzana menehune (Moloka'i, Hawaiian Islands)
 Small O‘ahu crake, Porzana ziegleri (Oahu, Hawaiian Islands)
 Small Maui crake, Porzana keplerorum (Maui, Hawaiian Islands)
 Easter Island crake, Porzana sp. (Easter Island, Southeast Pacific)
 Great Hawaiian crake, Porzana sp. (Big Island, Hawaiian Islands)
 Great Kaua‘i crake, Porzana sp. (Kauai, Hawaiian Islands)
 Huahine crake, Porzana sp. (Huahine, Society Islands)
 Mangaia crake #2, Porzana sp. (Mangaia, Cook Islands)
 Marquesas crake, Porzana sp. (Ua Huka, Marquesas)
 Mariana crake, Porzana sp. (Marianas, West Pacific) – possibly four species
 Medium Kaua'i crake, Porzana sp. (Kauai, Hawaiian Islands)
 Medium Maui crake, Porzana sp. (Maui, Hawaiian Islands)
 Small Hawaiian crake, Porzana sp. (Big Island, Hawaiian Islands)
 Hodgens' waterhen, Tribonyx hodgenorum (New Zealand)
 Viti Levu gallinule, ?Gallinula sp. (Viti Levu, Fiji) – would be separated into Pareudiastes if that genus is considered valid, or may be a new genus
 New Zealand coot, Fulica prisca (New Zealand)
 Chatham coot, Fulica chathamensis (Chatham Islands, Southwest Pacific)
 Fulica montanei (Chile)
 Vavau rail, Hypotaenidia vavauensis (Vava'u, Tonga)
 Placement unresolved
 Barbados rail, Rallidae gen. et sp. indet. (Barbados, West Indies) – formerly Fulica podagrica (partim)
 Easter Island rail, Rallidae gen. et sp. indet. (Easter Island)
 Fernando de Noronha rail, Rallidae gen. et sp. indet. (Fernando de Noronha, Atlantic) – probably survived into historic times
 Gruidae – cranes
 Extinct species of extant genera
 Cuban flightless crane, Antigone cubensis (Cuba, West Indies)
 †Aptornithidae – adzebills (probably belongs in a separate order)
 †Aptornis
 North Island adzebill, Aptornis otidiformis (North Island, New Zealand)
 South Island adzebill, Aptornis defossor (South Island, New Zealand)

Eurypygiformes
 Rhynochetidae – kagus
 Extinct species of extant genera
 Lowland kagu, Rhynochetos orarius (New Caledonia, Melanesia)

Ciconiiformes
 Ciconiidae – storks
 Extinct species of extant genera
 Leptoptilos robustus (Flores, Indonesia)
 Asphalt stork or La Brea stork, Ciconia maltha (western and southern U.S.)
 Mycteria wetmorei (Cuba)

Pelecaniformes
 Ardeidae – herons
 Extinct species of extant genera
 Bennu heron, Ardea bennuides (United Arab Emirates)
 Niue night heron, Nycticorax kalavikai (Niue)
 Eua night heron, Nycticorax sp. ('Eua, Tonga)
 Lifuka night heron, Nycticorax sp. (Lifuka, Tonga) – may be synomymous with the Eua night heron
 Mangaia night heron, Nycticorax sp. (Mangaia, Cook Islands)
 Placement unresolved
 Ardeidae gen. et sp. indet. (Easter Island, E Pacific)
 Threskiornithidae – ibises
 †Apteribis
 Maui flightless ibis, Apteribis brevis (Maui, Hawaiian Islands)
 Maui lowland apteribis, Apteribis sp. (Maui, Hawaiian Islands)
 Molokai flightless ibis, Apteribis glenos (Molokai, Hawaiian Islands)
 †Xenicibis
 Jamaican ibis, Xenicibis xympithecus (Jamaica, West Indies)

Cathartiformes
 †Teratornithidae – teratorns
 †Teratornis
 Merriam's teratorn, Teratornis merriami (southwestern and southeastern U.S.)
 †Oscaravis
 Cuban teratorn, Oscaravis olsoni (Cuba)
 Cathartidae – New World vultures
 †Pampagyps 
 Pampagyps imperator (Argentina)
 †Wingegyps 
 Wingegyps cartellei (Brazil)
 †Pleistovultur 
 Pleistovultur nevesi (Brazil)
 †Geronogyps 
 Geronogyps reliquus (Peru and Argentina)
 †Breagyps 
 La Brea condor or long-legged vulture, Breagyps clarki (southwestern U.S.) 
 Extinct species of extant genera
 Emslie's vulture, Cathartes emsliei (Cuba, West Indies)
 Pleistocene black vulture, Coragyps occidentalis (southwestern and western U.S.)
 Cuban condor, Gymnogyps varonai (Cuba, West Indies)

Suliformes
The group that includes modern boobies, gannets and cormorants.
 Phalacrocoracidae – cormorants and shags
 Extinct species of extant genera
 Serventy's cormorant, Microcarbo serventyorum (Western Australia)
 Madagascar cormorant, Phalacrocorax sp. (Madagascar)
 Kohatu shag, Leucocarbo septentrionalis (North Island, New Zealand)
 Sulidae – gannets and boobies
 Extinct subspecies of extant species
 Ua Huka booby, Papasula abbotti costelloi (Ua Huka, Marquesas)

Phoenicopteriformes
The group that includes modern flamingos.
 Phoenicopteridae - flamingos
 Extinct species of extant genera
 Phoenicopterus copei (Late Pleistocene of W North America and C Mexico)
 Phoenicopterus minutus (Late Pleistocene of California, U.S.)

Procellariiformes
The group that includes modern albatrosses, shearwaters, petrels and storm petrels.
 Procellariidae – petrels
 Extinct species of extant genera
 Dune shearwater or Hole's shearwater, Puffinus holeae (Fuerteventura, Canary Islands, and the Atlantic coast of the Iberian Peninsula)
 Lava shearwater or Olson's shearwater, Puffinus olsoni (Canary Islands, E Atlantic)
 Saint Helena shearwater, Puffinus pacificoides (St. Helena, South Atlantic)
 Scarlett's shearwater, Puffinus spelaeus (South Island, New Zealand)
 Menorcan shearwater, Puffinus sp. (Menorca, Balearic Islands) – possibly an extirpated population of an extant species
 Eua shearwater, Puffinus sp. (Eua, Tonga)
 Eua petrel, Puffinus sp. (Eua, Tonga)
 Oahu petrel, Pterodroma jugabilis (Oahu, Hawaiian Islands)
 Canary Islands petrel, Pterodroma sp. (El Hierro, Canary Islands) – possibly an extirpated population of an extant species
 Pterodroma sp. (Chatham Islands, Southwest Pacific)
 Pterodroma sp. (Henderson Island, S Pacific)
 Pterodroma sp. (Norfolk Island, Southwest Pacific)
 Bourne's petrel, Pterodroma sp. (Rodrigues)
 Pseudobulweria sp. (Taravai, Angakauitai, Mangareva)
 Placement unresolved
 Procellariidae sp. (Easter Island, East Pacific) – possibly an extirpated population of an extant species

Sphenisciformes
 Spheniscidae – penguins
 Extinct species of extant genera
 Chatham penguin, Eudyptes warhami (Chatham Islands, Southwest Pacific) – possibly still extant between 1867 and 1872
 Waitaha penguin, Megadyptes waitaha (South Island and Stewart Island, New Zealand)

Columbiformes
 Columbidae – doves and pigeons
 †Dysmoropelia
 Saint Helena dove, Dysmoropelia dekarchiskos (Saint Helena, South Atlantic) – known from Late Pleistocene bones, but may have persisted until the 16th century
 †Natunaornis
 Viti Levu giant pigeon, Natunaornis gigoura (Viti Levu, Fiji)
 †Bountyphaps
 Henderson Island archaic pigeon, Bountyphaps obsoleta (Henderson Island, South Pacific)
 †Tongoenas
 Tongan giant pigeon, Tongoenas burleyi (Tonga)
 Extinct species of extant genera
 Huahine cuckoo-dove, Macropygia arevarevauupa (Huahine, Society Islands)
 Marquesas cuckoo-dove, Macropygia heana (Marquesas, Pacific)
 Puerto Rican quail-dove, Geotrygon larva (Puerto Rico, West Indies)
 Great ground dove, Pampusana nui (Marquesas and Cook Islands)
 Henderson ground dove, Pampusana leonpascoi (Henderson Island, South Pacific)
 New Caledonian ground dove, Pampusana longitarsus (New Caledonia)
 Huahine ground dove, Pampusana sp. (Huahine, Society Islands) – P. nui?
 Mangaia ground dove, Pampusana sp. (Mangaia, Cook Islands) – P. nui?
 Rota ground dove, Pampusana sp. (Rota, Marianas)
 Tongan tooth-billed pigeon, Didunculus placopedetes (Tonga, Pacific)
 Kanaka pigeon, Caloenas canacorum (New Caledonia, Tonga)
 Henderson imperial pigeon, Ducula harrisoni (Henderson Island, South Pacific)
 Lakeba imperial pigeon, Ducula lakeba (Lakeba, Fiji)
 Steadman's imperial pigeon, Ducula david ('Eua, Tonga, and Wallis Island)
 Tongan imperial pigeon, Ducula sp. ('Eua, Foa and Lifuka, Tonga) – may be synomymous with either D. lakeba or D. david, or possibly a new species
 Shutler's fruit pigeon, Ducula shutleri (Vava'u and Tongatapu, Tonga)
 Ducula cf. galeata (Cook Islands) – possibly a new species
 Ducula cf. galeata (Society Islands) – possibly a new species
 Ducula sp. (Viti Levu, Fiji) – may be synomymous with D. lakeba
 Tubuai fruit dove, Ptilinopus sp. (Tubuai, Austral Islands)
 Columba melitensis (Malta, Sicily)

Mesitornithiformes
 Mesitornithidae – mesites
Extinct species of extant genera
 Monias sp. (Madagascar)

Psittaciformes
 Placement unresolved
 Psittaciformes gen. et sp. indet. (Rota, Marianas) – cf. Cacatua / Eclectus?
 Strigopidae – kakas and kakapos
 Extinct species of extant genera
 Chatham kākā, Nestor chathamensis (Chatham Islands, Southwest Pacific)
 Cacatuidae – cockatoos
 Extinct species of extant genera
 New Caledonian cockatoo, Cacatua sp. (New Caledonia)
 New Ireland cockatoo, Cacatua sp. (New Ireland)
 Psittacidae – parrots, parakeets, and lorikeets
 Extinct species of extant genera
 Saint Croix macaw, Ara autocthones (St. Croix, West Indies)
 Oceanic eclectus, Eclectus infectus (Tonga, Vanuatu, possibly Fiji) – may have survived to the 18th century or even longer
 Sinoto's lorikeet, Vini sinotoi (Marquesas, Pacific)
 Conquered lorikeet, Vini vidivici (Mangaia, Cook Islands, and Marqesas)
 Campbell parakeet, Cyanoramphus sp. (Campbell Island, New Zealand)
 Extinct subspecies of an extant species
 Virgin Islands amazon (Amazona vittata ssp. indet.)
 Placement unresolved
 Psittacidae gen. et sp. indet. 1 (Easter Island)
 Psittacidae gen. et sp. indet. 2 (Easter Island)
 Psittacidae gen. et sp. indet. (Guam, Marianas) – cf. Trichoglossus / Vini?

Cuculiformes
 Cuculidae – cuckoos
 Extinct species of extant genera
 Henderson Island koel, Urodynamis cf. taitensis
 Ancient coua, Coua primaeva (Madagascar)
 Bertha's coua, Coua berthae (Madagascar)
 Extinct subspecies of extant species
 Conkling's greater roadrunner, Geococcyx californianus conklingi (inland SW North America)

Accipitriformes
Birds of prey
 Accipitridae – hawks and eagles
 †Bermuteo
 Bermuda hawk, Bermuteo avivorus (Bermuda, West Atlantic)
 †Amplibuteo
 Woodward's eagle, Amplibuteo woodwardi (North America and West Indies)
 †Gigantohierax
 Gigantohierax suarezi (Cuba, West Indies)
 Gigantohierax itchei (Cuba, West Indies)
 †Titanohierax
 Titanohierax gloveralleni (Bahamas, West Indies)
 Titanohierax sp. (Hispaniola, West Indies)
Extinct species of extant genera
 Powerful goshawk, Accipiter efficax (New Caledonia, Melanesia)
 Gracile goshawk, Accipiter quartus (New Caledonia, Melanesia)
 Accipiter sp. 1 (New Ireland, Melanesia)
 Accipiter sp. 2 (New Ireland, Melanesia) – one of the two New Ireland species may be the extant Meyer's goshawk
 Aquila sp. "large" (Madagascar)
 Aquila sp. "small" (Madagascar)
 Buteogallus borrasi (Cuba, West Indies) – formerly in Aquila / Titanohierax
 Wood harrier, Circus dossenus (Moloka‘i, Hawaiian Islands)
 Eyles's harrier, Circus eylesi (New Zealand) (Forbes' harrier, Circus teauteensis, is considered synonymous with Eyles's harrier by some authorities)
 Haast's eagle, Hieraeetus moorei (South Island, New Zealand)
 A subfossil sea eagle (Haliaeetus) from Maui may be a valid species or a subspecies; another one listed from the Chatham Islands is in error
 Malagasy crowned eagle, Stephanoaetus mahery (Madagascar)
Extinct subspecies of extant species
 Aquila chrysaetos simurgh (Crete) (sometimes considered a distinct species)

Falconiformes
 Falconidae – falcons
Extinct species of extant genera
 Puerto Rican caracara, Caracara latebrosus (Puerto Rico, West Indies)
 Bahaman caracara, Caracara creightoni (Bahamas and Cuba, West Indies) – may be synomynous with Caracara latebrosus
 Jamaican caracara, Caracara tellustris (Jamaica, West Indies)
 La Brea caracara, Caracara prelutosa (Rancho La Brea, San Miguel Island, California)
 Caracara major (Venezuela)
 Caracara seymouri (Peru, Ecuador)
 Cuban caracara, Milvago carbo (Cuba, West Indies)
 ?Milvago sp. (Jamaica, West Indies)
 Cuban kestrel, Falco kurochkini (Cuba, West Indies) – may have survived to the 17th century
 Phalcoboenus napieri (Falkland Islands)

Caprimulgiformes
Nightjars and potoos
 Caprimulgidae – nightjars
 Extinct species of extant genera
 Cuban pauraque, Siphonorhis daiquiri (Cuba, West Indies) – possibly extant

Aegotheliformes
Owlet-nightjars
 Aegothelidae
 Extinct species of extant genera
 New Zealand owlet-nightjar, Aegotheles novaezealandiae (New Zealand) – formerly Megaegotheles

Apodiformes
Swifts  and hummingbirds.
 Apodidae – swifts
 Extinct species of extant genera
 Mangaia swiftlet, Aerodramus manuoi (Mangaia, Cook Islands) – formerly Collocalia

Bucerotiformes
Hornbills and relatives. Formerly included in Coraciiformes.
 Bucerotidae – hornbills
 Extinct species of extant genera
 Lifou hornbill, Rhyticeros ("Aceros") sp. (Lifou, Loyalty Islands)

Piciformes
Woodpeckers, puffbird and jacamars.
 Picidae – woodpeckers
 Extinct species of extant genera
 Bermuda flicker, Colaptes oceanicus (Bermuda, West Atlantic) – known from Late Pleistocene and Holocene bones, but may have persisted until the 17th century

Coraciiformes
 Brachypteraciidae – ground rollers
 Extinct species of extant genera
 Brachypteracias
 Ampoza ground roller, Brachypteracias lagrandi (Madagascar)

Strigiformes
Typical owls and barn owls.
 Strigidae – typical owls
 †Grallistrix
 Kauai stilt-owl, Grallistrix auceps (Kauaʻi, Hawaiian Islands)
 Maui stilt-owl, Grallistrix erdmani (Maui, Hawaiian Islands)
 Molokai stilt-owl, Grallistrix geleches (Molokaʻi, Hawaiian Islands)
 Oahu stilt-owl, Grallistrix orion (O'ahu, Hawaiian Islands)
 †Ornimegalonyx
 Cuban giant owl, Ornimegalonyx oteroi (Cuba, West Indies)
 Ornimegalonyx sp. – probably a subspecies of O. oteroi
 †Asphaltoglaux
 Asphalt miniature owl, Asphaltoglaux cecileae (Southern California, North America)
 †Oraristrix
 La Brea owl, Oraristrix brea (Southern California, North America)
 Extinct species of extant genera
 Cuban horned owl, Bubo osvaldoi (Cuba, West Indies)
 Cretan owl, Athene cretensis (Crete, Mediterranean)
 New Caledonia boobook, Ninox cf. novaeseelandiae (New Caledonia, Melanesia) – possibly extant
 Madeiran scops owl (Otus mauli) (Madeira)
 São Miguel scops owl (Otus frutuosoi) (Azores)
 Kurochkin's pygmy owl (Glaucidium kurochkini) (Southern California, North America)
 Bermuda saw-whet owl (Aegolius gradyi) (Bermuda) – known from Pleistocene bones, but may have persisted until the early 1600s
 Asio ecuadoriensis (Ecuador)
 Placement unresolved
 Strigidae gen. et sp. indet. (Ibiza, Mediterranean)
 Tytonidae – barn owls
 Extinct species of extant genera
 Puerto Rican barn owl, Tyto cavatica (Puerto Rico, West Indies) – may still have existed up to 1912; likely a subspecies of, or synonymous with, the extant ashy-faced owl (Tyto glaucops)
 Cuban dwarf barn owl, Tyto maniola (Cuba, West Indies)
 New Caledonian barn owl, ?Tyto letocarti (New Caledonia, Melanesia)
 Maltese barn owl, Tyto melitensis (Malta, Mediterranean) – possibly a paleosubspecies of, or synonymous with, the extant western barn owl (Tyto alba)
 Noel's barn owl, Tyto noeli (Cuba, Barbuda, West Indies) – Tyto neddi is a synonym 
 Hispaniolan barn owl, Tyto ostologa (Hispaniola, West Indies)
 Bahama giant barn owl, Tyto pollens (Little Exuma and New Providence, Bahamas, West Indies) – Rivero's barn owl (Tyto riveroi) is a synonym 
 Antiguan barn owl Tyto sp. (Antigua, West Indies)
 Mussau barn owl, Tyto cf. novaehollandiae (Mussau, Melanesia)
 Greater New Ireland barn owl, Tyto cf. novaehollandiae (New Ireland, Melanesia)
 Lesser New Ireland barn owl, Tyto cf. alba / aurantiaca (New Ireland, Melanesia)
 Craves’ giant barn owl, Tyto cravesae (Cuba, West Indies)

Passeriformes
 Placement unresolved
 Slender-billed Kauai passerine, Passeriformes gen. et sp. indet. (Kauai, Hawaiian Islands)
 Tiny Kauai passerine, Passeriformes gen. et sp. indet. (Kauai, Hawaiian Islands)
 Acanthisittidae – New Zealand wrens
 †Pachyplichas
 South Island stout-legged wren, Pachyplichas yaldwyni (North Island, New Zealand)
 North Island stout-legged wren, Pachyplichas jagmi (South Island, New Zealand) – may be a subspecies of P. yaldwyni
 †Dendroscansor
 Long-billed wren, Dendroscansor decurvirostris (South Island, New Zealand)
 Extinct subspecies of extant species
 North Island rock wren, Xenicus gilviventris ssp. nov. (North Island, New Zealand) – a subspecies of X. gilviventris
 Corvidae – crows, ravens, jays and magpies
 Extinct species of extant genera
 High-billed crow, Corvus impluviatus (Oahu, Hawaiian Islands)
 Robust crow, Corvus viriosus (Oahu and Molokai, Hawaiian Islands)
 Corvus sp. (Puu Waawaa, North Kona District, Big Island, Hawaiian Islands)
 New Zealand raven, Corvus antipodum (New Zealand)
 North Island raven, Corvus antipodum antipodum (North Island, New Zealand)
 South Island raven, Corvus antipodum pycrafti (South Island, New Zealand)
 Chatham raven, Corvus moriorum (Chatham Islands, Southwest Pacific)
 New Ireland crow, Corvus sp. (New Ireland, Melanesia)
 Puerto Rican crow, Corvus pumilis (Puerto Rico and St. Croix, West Indies) – probably a subspecies of either the Cuban crow (Corvus nasicus) or the palm crow (Corvus palmarum)
 Hirundinidae – swallows and martins
 Extinct subspecies of extant species
 Henderson Island Pacific swallow, Hirundo tahitensis ssp. nov. (Henderson Island, South Pacific)
 Cettiidae – bush warblers
 Extinct species of extant genera
 Eua bush warbler, Horornis sp. (Eua, Tonga) 
 Zosteropidae – white-eyes
 Placement unresolved
 Tongan large white-eye, Zosteropidae gen. et sp. indet. (Eua, Tonga)
 Guam large white-eye, Zosteropidae gen. et sp. indet. (Guam, Marianas)
 Sturnidae – starlings
 †Cryptopsar
 Mauritius starling, Cryptopsar ischyrhynchus (Mauritius, Mascarenes)
 Extinct species of extant genera
 Huahine starling, Aplonis diluvialis (Huahine, Society Islands)
 Erromango starling, Aplonis sp. (Erromango, Vanuatu)
 Turdidae – thrushes
 †Meridiocichla
 Meridiocichla salotti (Corsica)
 Extinct species of extant genera
 Olomao, Myadestes lanaiensis (Maui, Hawaiian Islands) – may have survived until the 19th century
 Mohoidae – Hawaiian honeyeaters
 Prehistorically extinct species of recently extinct genera
 Oahu kioea, Chaetoptila cf. angustipluma (Oahu and Maui, Hawaiian Islands)
 Narrow-billed kioea, ?Chaetoptila sp. (Maui, Hawaiian Islands)
 Fringillidae – true finches and Hawaiian honeycreepers
 †Orthiospiza
 Highland finch, Orthiospiza howarthi (Maui, Hawaiian Islands)
 †Xestospiza
 Cone-billed finch, Xestospiza conica (Kauai and Oahu, Hawaiian Islands)
 Ridge-billed finch, Xestospiza fastigialis (Oahu, Maui and Molokai, Hawaiian Islands)
 †Vangulifer
 Strange-billed finch, Vangulifer mirandus (Maui, Hawaiian Islands)
 Thin-billed finch, Vangulifer neophasis (Maui, Hawaiian Islands)
 †Aidemedia
 Oahu icterid-like gaper, Aidemedia chascax (Oahu, Hawaiian Islands)
 Sickle-billed gaper, Aidemedia zanclops (Oahu, Hawaiian Islands)
 Maui Nui icterid-like gaper, Aidemedia lutetiae (Maui and Molokai, Hawaiian Islands)
 Prehistorically extinct species of extant and recently extinct genera
 Slender-billed greenfinch, Chloris aurelioi (Tenerife, Canary Islands)
 Trias greenfinch, Chloris triasi (La Palma, Canary Islands)
 Greater Azores bullfinch, Pyrrhula crassa (Graciosa, Azores)
 Kauai finch, Telespiza persecutrix (Kauai and Oahu, Hawaiian Islands)
 Maui Nui finch, Telespiza ypsilon (Maui and Molokai, Hawaiian Islands)
 Maui finch, Telespiza cf. ypsilon (Maui, Hawaiian Islands)
 Kauai palila, Loxioides kikuichi (Kauai, Hawaiian Islands) – possibly survived until the early 18th century
 Scissor-billed koa finch, Rhodacanthis forfex (Kauai and Maui, Hawaiian Islands)
 Primitive koa finch, Rhodacanthis litotes (Oahu and Maui, Hawaiian Islands)
 Wahi grosbeak, Chloridops wahi (Oahu and Maui, Hawaiian Islands)
 King Kong grosbeak, Chloridops regiskongi (Oahu, Hawaiian Islands)
 Kauai grosbeak, Chloridops sp. (Kauai, Hawaiian Islands) – may be synomynous with C. wahi
 Maui grosbeak, Chloridops sp. (Maui, Hawaiian Islands)
 Giant nukupuu, Hemignathus vorpalis (Big Island, Hawaiian Islands)
 Hoopoe-billed akialoa, Akialoa upupirostris (Kauai and Oahu, Hawaiian Islands)
 Giant akialoa, Akialoa sp. (Big Island, Hawaiian Islands)
 Akialoa sp.  (Maui, Hawaiian Islands)
 Stout-legged finch, Ciridops tenax (Kauai, Hawaiian Islands)
 Molokai ula-ai-hawane, Ciridops cf. anna (Molokai, Hawaiian Islands)
 Oahu ula-ai-hawane, Ciridops sp. (Oʻahu, Hawaiian Islands)
 Placement unresolved
 Drepanidini gen. et sp. indet. (Maui, Hawaiian Islands) – at least three species
 Drepanidini gen. et sp. indet. (Oahu, Hawaiian Islands)
 Estrildidae – waxbills
 Extinct species of extant genera
 Marianas parrotfinch, Erythrura sp. (Guam and Rota, Marianas)
 Emberizidae – Old World buntings
 Extinct species of extant genera
 Long-legged bunting, Emberiza alcoveri (Tenerife, Canary Islands)  
 Passerellidae – New World sparrows
 †Pedinorhis
 Puerto Rican obscure bunting, Pedinorhis stirpsarcana (Puerto Rico, West Indies)
Icteridae - New World blackbirds, orioles and grackles
 †Pandanaris
 Convex-billed cowbird, Pandanaris convexa (California and Florida south through Mexico to South America)
Extinct species of extant genera
 Large-billed blackbird, Euphagus magnirostris (California south to South America)
 Talara cowbird, Molothrus resinosus (Peru)
 Talara troupial, Icterus turmalis (Peru)

See also
 List of extinct bird species since 1500
 List of fossil bird genera
 Lists of extinct species
 Flightless bird
 Holocene extinction event
 Prehistoric life

References

Citations

General
 Steadman, David William (2006): Extinction and Biogeography of Tropical Pacific Birds. University of Chicago Press. 
 Balouet, Jean-Christophe;  Olson, Storrs L. (1989) Fossil birds from late Quaternary deposits in New Caledonia. Washington, D. C. Smithsonian contributions to zoology; Nr. 469. Smithsonian Institution Press
 Goodman, S.M. and Patterson, B.D. (1997) Natural Change and Human Impact in Madagascar. Smithsonian Institution Press, Washington and London. 432 S. 
 del Hoyo, J., Andrew Elliott, David Christie (2007) Handbook of the Birds of the World Volume 12 Picathartes to Tits and Chickadees, Lynx Edicions, 2007. 
  Turvey, Samuel T. (edit.) (2009) Holocene Extinctions. Oxford University Press. 
 Feduccia, Alan (1999) The Origin and Evolution of Birds. 2nd. Edit. Yale University Press.

External links
 The Great New Zealand Eagle: The World's Biggest Eagle By Neville Guthrie

 
Birds Quaternary
Late Quaternary birds